Skipperlings are butterflies in the subfamily Heteropterinae. With about 150 described species, this is one of several smaller skipper butterfly subfamilies.

Genera
The subfamily includes the following genera:

 Apostictopterus Leech, 1893
 Argopteron Watson, 1893
 Barca de Nicéville, 1902
 Butleria Kirby, 1871
 Carterocephalus Lederer, 1852
 Dalla Mabille, 1904
 Dardarina Evans, 1937
 Freemaniana Warren, 2001
 Heteropterus Duméril, 1806
 Hovala Evans, 1937
 Ladda Grishin, 2019
 Lepella Evans, 1937
 Leptalina Mabille, 1904
 Metisella Hemming, 1934
 Piruna Evans, 1955
 Tsitana Evans, 1937

External links
  TOL

Hesperiidae